The Abraham Catalogue of Belgian Newspapers is an online database of historical Belgian newspapers that are preserved in libraries and other heritage institutions across Flanders and Brussels.

Contents 
Abraham catalogues the location and ownership of Belgian national, regional, and local newspapers kept in more than one hundred libraries and heritage institutions. So far, over 11,000 newspaper titles published after 1800 are inventoried in the catalogue.

The database shows the most important specifications of each newspaper, such as title, date, and place of publication. Keywords indicate the type of newspaper (with a focus on e.g. trade, sports, or advertising) or the social community at which the newspaper was aimed (e.g. catholic, liberal, or socialist community). Seeing that newspapers were often attached to a certain city or region, the database allows searching on geographical terms.

Users are able to see detailed information on the exact editions and locations of each newspaper, including the format (paper, microform, or digital format) in which it is preserved in each of the institutions. Links are added for newspapers that are consultable online. It is not possible to search on content of any newspaper article.

Name 
The database was named after Abraham Verhoeven (Antwerp, 1575–1652), who is considered to be the first publisher of newspapers in the Southern Netherlands. His Nieuwe Tijdinghen (New Tidings) was a substantial contribution to the early beginnings of a daily form of newspaper.

The Abraham database: development and continuation 
Abraham was developed as a project in 2007 by the Hendrik Conscience Heritage Library in cooperation with a large number of heritage institutions. The catalogue was created to increase access to historical newspapers, a goldmine of cultural-historical information. The catalogue is also used as a helpful tool for digitising projects. In this way, Abraham plays an important role in the preservation of these vulnerable documents. Frequent consultation of the newspapers poses considerable risks, especially for those published from 1830 to 1950, which were often printed on fragile and low-quality paper. The only way to preserve their contents for posterity is to copy them to microform or digital format.

At the end of 2008, the project was taken over by the then newly founded Flanders Heritage Library. Together with various partners from the heritage field, the Flanders Heritage Library is further actively updating and enriching the database with new records.

See also
 Cultural heritage
 Library catalog
 Library science
 Archive
 Digital library
 History of newspaper publishing
 Newspaper digitization
 Online public access catalog

References

External links
Online database
Background information (only available in Dutch)

Libraries in Belgium
Library cataloging and classification
Documents
Newspapers published in Belgium
Archives in Belgium